Mount La Perouse is a 10,728-foot (3,270 meter) glaciated mountain summit located in the Fairweather Range of the Saint Elias Mountains, in southeast Alaska, United States. Topographic relief is significant as the mountain rises up from tidewater in less than nine miles. The mountain was named in 1874 by William Healey Dall of the U.S. Geological Survey, for Jean-François de Galaup, comte de Lapérouse (1741–1788), a French navigator who explored this coastal area in 1786. The first ascent of the peak was made in 1953 by USGS party consisting of James Seitz, Karl Stauffer, Rowland Tabor, Rolland Reid, and Paul Bowen. On February 16, 2014, a colossal 68 million ton landslide broke free from the flanks of Mt. La Perouse and flowed nearly 4.6 miles (7.4 km) from where it originated. The months May through June offer the most favorable weather for climbing and viewing.

Climate

Based on the Köppen climate classification, Mount La Perouse has a subarctic climate with cold, snowy winters, and mild summers. Temperatures can drop below −20 °C with wind chill factors below −30 °C. This climate supports hanging glaciers on its slopes as well as the immense Brady Glacier to the east, Finger Glacier to the south, and La Perouse Glacier to the north and west. Precipitation runoff and meltwater from its glaciers drains into the Gulf of Alaska.

See also

Geography of Alaska

References

Gallery

External links
 Weather forecast: Mount La Perouse
 Account of first ascent: American Alpine Club
 Aerial photo: Flickr
 Flickr aerial photo: Finger Glacier and Mt. La Perouse
 Flickr photo: 2014 landslide
 Mount La Perouse pronunciation

La Perouse
La Perouse
La Perouse
La Perouse
La Perouse